Plaza de los Mariachis is a plaza in Guadalajara, in the Mexican state of Jalisco. The plaza often hosts mariachi bands.

References

External links

 

Guadalajara, Jalisco
Plazas in Jalisco